Long Story Short is the debut studio album by Illy. The album was released on 15 April 2009. It includes collaborations with Phrase, N'Fa, Pegz and Spit Syndicate. The bulk of the album was produced by M-Phazes and J-Skub. Both the singles, "Pictures" and "Generation Y" were placed on Triple J national rotation.

Track listing
 "Generation Y"
 "Black Cap Rap" (feat. Pegz)
 "Full Tank"
 "My Way"
 "Rock Star Shit"
 "Pictures"
 "This Or That"
 "Our Country"
 "Red Light Green Light" (feat. Spit Syndicate, Solo And Cisco Tavares)
 "Brother"
 "For You" (feat. Phrase and N'Fa)
 "Dumb It Down"
 "Long Story Short" (feat. Cisco Tavares)
 "All Around the World" (feat. Kulaia)

Production
 M-Phazes - Tracks 1, 2, 5, 9, 10, 11, 14
 J-Skub - Tracks 3, 6, 7, 8
 Jsquared - Tracks 4, 13
 Ta-Ku - Track 12

References

2009 debut albums
Illy (rapper) albums
Albums produced by M-Phazes
Obese Records albums